Huey P. Long House was a historic house located at 2403 Laurel Street in Shreveport, Louisiana. It was built in c.1905. and was listed on the National Register of Historic Places in 1991.

The house was destroyed by fire in September 1992, and was delisted on May 2, 2016.

Description and history 
It was built around 1905 and was a modest one-story Queen Anne house with Colonial Revival columns. Huey Long and family moved into the house in 1918 and lived there until 1926. Additions to the house were made in 1924.  It is significant for its association with the early career of Huey Long.

See also
Huey P. Long Mansion, in New Orleans, listed on the NRHP
Huey P. Long House (Forest Ave., Shreveport, Louisiana) at 305 Forest Ave., listed on the NRHP
National Register of Historic Places listings in Caddo Parish, Louisiana

References

Houses on the National Register of Historic Places in Louisiana
Houses in Shreveport, Louisiana
National Register of Historic Places in Caddo Parish, Louisiana
Former National Register of Historic Places in Louisiana
Huey Long